Monica Afia Twum (born 14 March 1978) is a female track and field sprinter from Ghana. Together with Mavis Akoto, Vida Anim and Vida Nsiah she holds the Ghanaian record in 4 x 100 metres relay with 43.19 seconds, achieved during the heats at the 2000 Summer Olympics in Sydney.

Achievements

Personal bests
100 metres - 11.31 s (2001)
200 metres - 22.98 s (1999)

External links
 

1978 births
Living people
Ghanaian female sprinters
Athletes (track and field) at the 2000 Summer Olympics
Olympic athletes of Ghana
Athletes (track and field) at the 1998 Commonwealth Games
Commonwealth Games competitors for Ghana
African Games bronze medalists for Ghana
African Games medalists in athletics (track and field)
Athletes (track and field) at the 1999 All-Africa Games
Olympic female sprinters
20th-century Ghanaian women
21st-century Ghanaian women